Oliver H. Fritz was a member of the Wisconsin State Assembly.

Biography
Fritz was born on November 20, 1905. From 1928 to 1933, he served in what is now the Wisconsin Army National Guard. He held the rank of sergeant. He died on December 1, 1985, in San Diego, California.

Assembly career
Fritz was a member of the Assembly during the 1937 session. He was affiliated with the Wisconsin Progressive Party.

References

Members of the Wisconsin State Assembly
Wisconsin Progressives (1924)
Military personnel from Wisconsin
United States Army soldiers
1905 births
1985 deaths
20th-century American politicians